Mohamed Cheikh Biadillah (born 1949 in Smara, Morocco) is a Moroccan gastroenterologist and politician. He served as Minister of Health in the government of Driss Jettou from 2002 to 2007. He has been secretary general of the Authenticity and Modernity Party since February 2009.

Biadillah was governor of the prefecture of Salé from 1992 to 1998, and wāli of the region Doukkala-Abda and governor of Safi from 1998 to 2002.

He was president of the House of Councillors from 13 October 2009 to October 2015.

References

1949 births
Living people
People from Smara
Moroccan gastroenterologists
Government ministers of Morocco
Health ministers of Morocco
Authenticity and Modernity Party politicians
Sahrawi politicians
Presidents of the House of Councillors (Morocco)